The Ariake Arena is a multi-sport venue located in Ariake, Kōtō, Tokyo, Japan. It served as the volleyball venue for the 2020 Summer Olympics and the wheelchair basketball knockout stage at the 2020 Summer Paralympics. This was the replacement of the Differ Ariake which was closed and demolished in June 2016.

History
The Ariake Arena was one of the six permanent facilities designed to be built in the district of Ariake in order to host the Olympic and Paralympic Games. Its construction began in January 2017 and was completed in December 2019. The total cost of the project was around 35 billion yen (about US$320 million) and it has the capacity 12,000 spectators, which can be expanded to a max capacity of 15,000 with temporary seating.

After the Olympic and Paralympic Games, a consortium let by Dentsu was granted an exclusive right to operate the facility until March 2046. Under a concession agreement, the Metropolitan Government receives a fixed amount of 9.4 billion yen (376 million yen per year) and a profit share payment (50% of pretax profit each year) from the consortium.

Events 
The arena is used for both sporting events and concerts.

In August 20, 2022 it opened as a public facility with a Perfume concert as part of its 9th Tour 2022 PLASMA

Billie Eilish performed in the arena for her Happier Than Ever, The World Tour on August 26, 2022.

It is scheduled to be used for the first time for sports after reopening with the B3 League game between Tokyo United v. Saitama Broncos, on October 9, 2022.

Charli XCX performed in Ariaka Arena on her Crash tour during the Tonal Tokyo Festival on October 29, 2022.

References

External links

Buildings and structures in Koto, Tokyo
Venues of the 2020 Summer Olympics
Basketball venues in Japan
Volleyball venues in Japan
Music venues in Tokyo
Sports venues in Tokyo
Sports venues completed in 2020
2020 establishments in Japan
Olympic volleyball venues